Ernesto "Ernie" Madarang Maceda Sr. (March 26, 1935 – June 20, 2016) was a Filipino politician, lawyer, and columnist who served as a Senator of the Philippines from 1971 to 1972 and again from 1987 to 1998. He served as Senate President from 1996 to 1998.

Early life and career
Maceda was born on March 26, 1935, in Pagsanjan, Laguna. Maceda earned his Associate in Arts degree, magna cum laude, in 1952, and Bachelor of Laws degree, cum laude, from the Ateneo de Manila University in 1956. He then finished Master of Laws, taxation and international law, at Harvard Law School, Massachusetts, US, in 1957.

At the age of 23, he was hailed as the No. 1 councilor of Manila in 1959. Because of his numerous achievements in the city council, Councilor Maceda was named “Outstanding Councilor of Manila".

Roles in the Marcos Cabinet
In 1966, Maceda was appointed as the Presidential Assistant on Community Development and was the youngest Cabinet Member of the Marcos administration.

In 1969, he was appointed executive secretary in concurrent capacity as chairman of the Commission on Reorganization.

In 1970, the Commerce and Industry portfolio was given to Maceda. In the post, he launched consumer protection programs and established trade relations with various Eastern European Social countries.

First Senate term (1971–72)
During the 1971 midterm elections, Maceda was only one out of three senators elected under the banner of the Nacionalista party of then-President Ferdinand Marcos. He took office on December 30, 1971. In 1972, Maceda's bill granting protection to real estate buyers on installment basis was the only bill signed into law before Martial Law was proclaimed. The bill is known as the Maceda Law. His term was supposed to have ended on December 30, 1977.

Break with Marcos, exile, and opposition leadership (1972–1986)
Maceda went into exile in the United States after breaking with President Marcos over the Martial Law declaration and eventually became the adviser of Senator Benigno Aquino Jr. Following Aquino's assassination, he became one of the leaders of the opposition during the 1984 Batasan Pambansa Campaign and the 1986 snap presidential election.

Second Senate term (1987–1992)
When Corazon Aquino was installed as President of the Philippines, he was appointed to head the Ministry of Natural Resources. The following year he ran for the Senate on Corazon Aquino's ticket and won. He served his second term as senator from June 30, 1987, to June 30, 1992.

In January 1991, a survey organized by Senate reporters regarding the senators' overall performance was released, with Maceda receiving the most number of points.

On September 16, 1991, Maceda was among the "Magnificent 12" senators who voted against the extension of the PH-US Bases Treaty.

Third Senate term (1992–1998)
During the 1992 general elections, Senator Maceda was re-elected under the Nationalist People's Coalition, which was a faction that bolted from the Nacionalista Party, headed by former Tarlac Governor Danding Cojuangco. Placed sixth in the senatorial race, he took office for the third time and served from June 30, 1992, to June 30, 1998. In his third term, he served as senate president from 1996 to 1998.

Senate Presidency
On October 10, 1996, the Senate was re-organized and Maceda was installed as Senate President succeeding Neptali A. Gonzales, Sr. In November of that year, Senate President Maceda delivered a speech denouncing the PEA-Amari Scandal – calling the same as the "grandmother of all scams". The PEA-Amari Scandal was a controversial deal involved the acquisition of 158 hectares of reclaimed land on Manila Bay that was to be converted into so-called Freedom Islands. The deal was forged as part of the Ramos administration's Manila Bay Master Development Plan (MBMDP). During this time, he was also nicknamed "Mr. Expose" by the Philippine Free Press.

Post-senate presidency
On January 26, 1998, he resigned as Senate President, citing loss of support by the majority of his fellow senators. Then Senator Neptali Gonzales, whom Maceda helped, was installed as Senate President from 1992 to 1993 and 1995 to 1996 succeeded him. Maceda became the new minority leader of the Senate. In February 1998, months before his second and last term as senator ended, Maceda ran for mayor of Manila in the 1998 presidential elections, but lost to Lito Atienza. Senator Juan Ponce Enrile, then the Assistant Minority Leader of the Senate became the acting minority leader even though he was also running for the presidency of the Philippines.

Ambassadorship (1998-2001) and later career
After his term in the Senate ended, Maceda was appointed Philippine Ambassador to the United States (1998–2001) by President Joseph Estrada. In the 2004 elections, Maceda ran for senator under the Koalisyon ng Nagkakaisang Pilipino of presidential candidate Fernando Poe, Jr. but lost. He ran again in the 2013 elections, but lost his bid to return to the Senate. Maceda holds the distinction of being the only Filipino to have held 5 Cabinet positions in his lifetime.

In 2007, he joined the Pamantasan ng Lungsod ng Maynila and became one of the professors of the PLM College of Law. He wrote a thrice-weekly column for the Philippine Star, entitled "Search For Truth", and hosted his own talk show "Mr. Expose" on the radio station DZRJ-AM.

Personal life
Maceda became estranged from his wife Maria Azucena, popularly known as Marichu Vera-Perez of Sampaguita Pictures fame. His father-in-law was the great star builder and producer Dr. Jose Perez. His marriage to Ms. Vera-Perez produced five sons: Emmanuel, Ernesto Jr., Erwin, Edmond, and Edward. Ernesto Jr. is a former vice mayor of Manila, while Edward currently serves as the representative of the 4th district of Manila and Edmond is director of sustainability at Enderun Colleges and a Sustainability Consultant to Megaworld Corporation. Ernesto Maceda also has ten grandchildren.

Death
Maceda died of multiple organ failure at St. Luke's Medical Center in Quezon City, Philippines on the night of June 20, 2016. He was aged 81. He was interred at the Loyola Memorial Park in Marikina on June 25, 2016.

References

External links and sources
Official Website of the Philippine Senate – Sen. Ernesto Maceda, PhD

1935 births
2016 deaths
Ateneo de Manila University alumni
Burials at the Loyola Memorial Park
Executive Secretaries of the Philippines
Filipino civil servants
Harvard Law School alumni
Manila City Council members
Ferdinand Marcos administration cabinet members
Minority leaders of the Senate of the Philippines
Nationalist People's Coalition politicians
People from Laguna (province)
The Philippine Star people
Presidents of the Senate of the Philippines
Presidents pro tempore of the Senate of the Philippines
Pwersa ng Masang Pilipino politicians
Senators of the 10th Congress of the Philippines
Senators of the 7th Congress of the Philippines
Senators of the 8th Congress of the Philippines
Senators of the 9th Congress of the Philippines
Secretaries of Environment and Natural Resources of the Philippines
Secretaries of Trade and Industry of the Philippines
United Nationalist Alliance politicians